This list of fictional ships lists all manner of artificial vehicles supported by water, which are either the subject of, or an important element of, a notable work of fiction.

Anime and manga
 Advenna Avis – Baccano!
 Alexandria – aircraft carrier in Genocyber
 SS Anne – ocean liner in Pokémon
 Argo (made from the wreck of the Japanese battleship Yamato) - space battleship in Star Blazers
 Argonaut – Heroic Age
Arcadia – Harlock's ship from the Japanese series Harlock Saga
 Asuka II (CVN-99) – United Nations (formerly with Japan Maritime Self Defense Force) aircraft carrier from Macross Zero
 Bebop – Cowboy Bebop
 Blue – Blue Drop
 Blue 6, Shang 9 – Blue Submarine No. 6
 SS Cussler (based on the RMS Titanic)– ocean liner in Pokémon: XY
 Decolore – cruise ship in Pokémon: Best Wishes!
 Ghost Ship – Blue Submarine No. 6
 Going Merry – One Piece
 Gran Tesoro – One Piece Film: Gold
 Harekaze (Y-467) – Kagerō-class destroyer, Yokosuka girls marines high school, High School Fleet
 HMS Eagle - Invincible-class aircraft carrier in Hellsing
 JDS Hotaka (DDG-170) – Atago-class destroyer in Detective Conan: Private Eye in the Distant Sea
 I-401 – Arpeggio of Blue Steel
 Illustria – United Nations aircraft carrier from Macross Zero
 JDF Ishin – Theta-class submersible destroyer (actually a frigate) from Innocent Venus
 Mermaid – ocean liner in Cat's Eye
  – Zipang
 Moby Dick – One Piece
 Nakatomi – oil tanker from Detective Conan: The Fist of Blue Sapphire
 SS Naked Sun – aircraft carrier from Kill la Kill
 Oro Jackson – One Piece
 Over the Rainbow (a renamed ) – Neon Genesis Evangelion
 Pascal Magi – Tactical Roar
 Penguin Manju Go – Icebreaker in A Place Further than the Universe
 Queen Berry – ocean liner in Gosick
 Queen Sallybeth – ocean liner in Detective Conan
 Seagallop – ferry in Pokémon Adventures
 SS Sinnoh – Pokémon Adventures
 SS Spiral – Pokémon Adventures
 St. Aphrodite – Detective Conan: Strategy Above the Depths
 Submarine Explorer 1 – Pokémon Generations and Pokémon Adventures
 Super 99 – Submarine Super 99
 Sweet Madonna – Full Ahead! Coco
 Tempest Junior – Thundersub
 Thousand Sunny – One Piece
 Thriller Bark – One Piece
 SS Tidal – ferry in Pokémon Adventures
 TK Tanker – oil tanker in Cat's Eye
 Tuatha de Danaan – submarine in Full Metal Panic!
 White Castle – large yacht in Biohazard: Heavenly Island
 Yashiromaru – Detective Conan: Strategy Above the Depths

Comics
 Aurora – trawler in The Adventures of Tintin story The Shooting Star
 The Black Freighter – metafictional pirate ship that is referenced throughout the Watchmen comic series
 Borneo Prince – 19th-century trading vessel converted for use as a gunboat in World War II in Commando Comics
 Cithara – alleged source of a distress signal in The Adventures of Tintin story The Shooting Star
 HMS Cutlass – name given to four ships of the Royal Navy – the first a battleship present at the Battle of the Nile; the second an ironclad sunk in World War I; the third a World War II destroyer, and the most recent ship a Cold War-era destroyer. All four ships appear in the Commando Comics story Bright Blade of Courage.
 Eagle's Shadow – Sir Nicholas Fury's ship in Marvel 1602
 Gotha – Kriegsmarine commerce raider, from the Commando Comics story Greedy For Glory
 Grossadler – Kriegsmarine battle cruiser, from the Commando Comics story Bright Blade of Courage
 Hawksub – Blackhawk
 Karaboudjan – Armenian cargo ship in The Adventures of Tintin story The Crab with the Golden Claws
 SS Ramona – tramp steamer in The Adventures of Tintin story The Red Sea Sharks
 Salty Sea Mare – ship owned by Captain Hoofbeard from the My Little Pony: Friendship Is Magic comic series story Friendship Ahoy!
 Sea Queen/The Gertrude – Lex Luthor's yacht in Superman Returns
 Sirius – expedition ship in The Adventures of Tintin stories The Shooting Star and Red Rackham's Treasure
 Unicorn – 17th-century three-masted armed Royal Navy vessel in The Adventures of Tintin stories The Secret of the Unicorn and Red Rackham's Treasure
  – British destroyer, from the Commando Comics story Bright Blade of Courage
 Vulkan – Kriegsmarine cruiser, from the Commando Comics story Flak Fever
 Wolfgang – Kriegsmarine pocket battleship, from the Commando Comics story O For Orange

Film
 903 – Iranian Kilo-class submarine in Steel Sharks, 1996
 USS Abraham Lincoln – frigate in Disney's 20,000 Leagues Under the Sea, 1954
 Academic Vladislav Volkov – Russian research ship in Virus, 1999
 Acheron – French Napoleonic frigate in Master and Commander: The Far Side of the World, 2003
 Aeolus – deserted 1930s cruise ship in Triangle, 2009
 African Queen – The African Queen with Humphrey Bogart and Katharine Hepburn, 1951
 USS Alameda (LPD-32) – landing ship, Godzilla, 2014
 Albatross – The Sea Hawk with Errol Flynn, 1940
 Alexandre Dumas – The Lover, 1992
 Altair – The Ghost Ship with Richard Dix, 1943
 Amindra – with shanghaied sailor from the Glencairn, torpedoed and sank in The Long Voyage Home, 1940
 SS Andes – cruise ship in Let's Go Native, 1930
 Angelina – Romancing the Stone, 1984
 SS Anne B – Jurassic Park, 1993
 MS Antonia Graza (based on the )  – derelict Italian luxury ocean liner in Ghost Ship, 2002
 Aquanaut 3 – experimental submarine, 30,000 Leagues Under the Sea, 2007
 Arabella – Captain Blood with Errol Flynn, 1935
 Argo – galley, Jason and the Argonauts, 1963, 2000
 USS Argus Hospital ship, World War Z, 2013
 Arcadia – cargo ship, Resident Evil, 2002
 SS Arcadia – cargo ship, Jurassic World: Fallen Kingdom, 2018
 Argonautica (based on the Grand Princess)  – cruise ship, Deep Rising, 1998
  – Full Fathom Five, 1990
 SS Atlantic (based on the sinking of the RMS Titanic, and the fictional ship's name has the sequel to the real-life ship the RMS Atlantic, and the ship on the movie is an inspiration for the RMS Titanic and the RMS Berengaria)  – ocean liner, Atlantic, 1929
 HMS Avenger – Billy Budd, 1962
 HMS Ballantrae – British Royal Navy  in Gift Horse, 1952
 Barracuda – Up Periscope, 1959
 Batavia Queen – steamship, Krakatoa, East of Java, 1969
 HMS Bedford – British Royal Navy Type 23 frigate in Tomorrow Never Dies, 1997
 USS Bedford (DLG-113) – The Bedford Incident, 1965 (also in book version)
 Belafonte – oceanographic research vessel, The Life Aquatic with Steve Zissou, 2004
 USS Belinda (APA-22) – Away All Boats, 1956 (also appears in original novel)
 Benthic Explorer – offshore support ship, The Abyss, 1989
 HMS Berkeley – in Up the Creek, 1958 
 Black Hawk – The Pirate of the Black Hawk (Il Pirata dello sparviero nero) 1958
 Black Pearl – Pirates of the Caribbean: The Curse of the Black Pearl, 2003
 Black Swan – The Black Swan, 1942
 KMS Brandenburg – German battleship in We Dive at Dawn, 1943
 SS Britannic (based on the TS Hamburg) – cruise ship in Juggernaut, 1974
  – The Caine Mutiny, 1954 (also appears in written version)
 Caledonia II – Some Like It Hot, 1959
 Cassidy – destroyer in In Harm's Way, 1965
 USS Charleston (SSN-704) – On the Beach, 2000
 Charlotte – National Treasure, 2004
 Chelsea – tugboat, The Curious Case of Benjamin Button, 2008
 HMS Chester – British Royal Navy Type 23 frigate in Tomorrow Never Dies, 1997
 SS Chiku Shan – ferryboat, Blood Alley, 1955
 SS Claridon (based on the SS Île-de-France) – ocean liner in The Last Voyage, 1960
 SS Colossal (based on the )  – ocean Liner, The Big Broadcast of 1938, 1938
 HMS Compass Rose – British Royal Navy Flower-class corvette in The Cruel Sea, 1953
  – World War II sub Destination Tokyo with Cary Grant, 1943
Corsair – in Crash Dive, 1943
 SS Crescent Star (based on the ships,  and SS American Star) – cruise ship that sinks in Seven Waves Away, 1957
 USS Dallas – submarine in The Hunt for Red October, 1990
 Daniel Webster – trawler in Sealed Cargo, 1951
 USS Davies (SSN-???) – Los Angeles-class SSN in Crash Dive, 1996
 Deep Quest – DSV in Raise the Titanic, 1980
 HMS Defiant – frigate in H.M.S. Defiant, 1962
 Denali – Philadelphia-based commercial supertanker in Down Periscope, 1996
  – British Royal Navy Type 23 frigate sunk in Tomorrow Never Dies, 1997
 HMS Dinosaur – British Royal Navy battleship in Things to Come, 1936
 Disco Volante – motor yacht/hydrofoil in Thunderball, 1965
 Dot Calmprivate yacht in Johnny English Strikes Again, 2018
 USS Dragonfish – U.S. submarine in Battle of the Coral Sea, 1959
 Dulcibella – The Riddle of the Sands, 1979
 USS Echo – sailing ship from The Wackiest Ship in the Army, 1959
 Edinburgh Trader – Pirates of the Caribbean: Dead Man's Chest, 2006
 Eindhoven Lion – oil tanker, Speed 2: Cruise Control, 1997
 Elizabeth Dane – The Fog, 1980
 Empress – Pirates of the Caribbean: At World's End, 2007
 HMS Endeavour – Pirates of the Caribbean: At World's End, 2007
 MS Ergenstrasse – The Sea Chase (1955) with John Wayne and Lana Turner, and briefly in Patriot Games with Harrison Ford, 1992
 SS Essess – Hot Shots!, 1991
 Flying Dutchman – Pirates of the Caribbean: Dead Man's Chest (2006), Pirates of the Caribbean: At World's End (2007)
 The Flying Wasp – Caddyshack, 1980
 MS Forest Swan – Panamanian cargo ship, Die Hard with a Vengeance, 1995
 Genesis – cruise ship in 2012, 2009
 Genoa Maru – Across the Pacific, 1942 (seen only briefly)
 Geronimo – America's Cup racing yacht, Wind, 1992
 Gerrymander – full-rigged sailing ship in Fair Wind to Java, 1953
 Ghost – sealing schooner, The Sea Wolf, 1941
 SS Gigantic – Streamlined Ocean Liner, The Big Broadcast of 1938, 1938
 Glencairn – freighter, The Long Voyage Home, 1940
 Gloria N – And the Ship Sails On (E la nave va), Federico Fellini, 1983
 Grayfish – Torpedo Run, 1958
 Hahnchen Maru – cargo vessel modified to command ship, Contact, 1997
 Hai Peng – Pirates of the Caribbean: At World's End, 2007
 SS Happy Wanderer (based on the ) – cruise liner, Carry On Cruising, 1962
 Hav Vind – Norwegian oil tanker, Cloverfield, 2008
 USS Haynes (DE-181) – destroyer escort, The Enemy Below, 1957
 The Henrietta – paddle steamer, Around the World in 80 Days, 1956
 Immer Essen ("Always Eating") – cruise ship, Dead Men Don't Wear Plaid, 1982
 The Inferno – The Goonies, 1985
 HMS Interceptor – Pirates of the Caribbean: The Curse of the Black Pearl, 2003
 USS Intrepid – cruise ship in the film Intrepid, 2000
 Jenny – Forrest Gump, 1994
 Jenny – tugboat in Beyond the Poseidon Adventure, 1979
 Jolly Roger – in Hook, 1991
 Kin Lung – tramp steamer in China Sea, 1935
 USS Kornblatt – destroyer in Don't Give Up the Ship, 1959
 USS Lansing (SSN-795) – Los Angeles-class SSN (depicted as an SSBN) in Danger Beneath the Sea, 2001
 USS Lawton – Kong: Skull Island, 2017
 CPMS Leegood – Canadian cargo ship, San Andreas, 2015
 Liparus – Karl Stromberg's submarine swallowing supertanker in The Spy Who Loved Me, 1977
 Love Nest – whaling ship in the 1923 Buster Keaton film The Love Nest, 1923
  – Captain Horatio Hornblower, 1951
 Mary Deare – The Wreck of the Mary Deare, starring Gary Cooper and Charlton Heston, 1959
 SS Minnow Johnson – civilian yacht, Rush Hour 2, 2001
 Misery – cargo ship, The Pebble and the Penguin, 1995
 USS Montana – The Abyss, 1989
 USS Montana – The Fifth Missile, 1986
 Morning Star – Cutthroat Island, 1995
 Nathan Ross – whaling ship, All the Brothers Were Valiant, 1953
 Nautilus – Captain Nemo's 1860s submarine, appears in several films including: 20,000 Leagues Under the Sea (1954), Mysterious Island (1961), Captain Nemo and the Underwater City (1969), The Return of Captain Nemo (1978) and The League of Extraordinary Gentlemen (2003)
 Neptune – in Gray Lady Down, 1978
 HMS Nereid – Royal Navy submarine, Virus, 1980
 Nerka – submarine in Run Silent, Run Deep, 1958
 Ning-Po – freighter owned by SPECTRE in You Only Live Twice, 1967
 USS Oakland (SSN-798) – Los Angeles-class SSN in Steel Sharks, 1996
 Odessa – Ukrainian cargo ship, The Day After Tomorrow, 2004
 Orca – Quint's fishing boat in Jaws, 1975
 Patna – tramp steamer in Lord Jim, 1965
 Pequod – whaleship, Moby Dick, 1956, 1978, 1998
 USS Pequod – American submarine, 2010: Moby Dick, 2010
 Poseidon – ocean liner/cruise ship, The Poseidon Adventure (1972) (based on the ), Beyond the Poseidon Adventure (1979), The Poseidon Adventure (2005), (based on the MS Grandeur of the Seas) Poseidon (2006) (inspired on the RMS Queen Mary 2)
 USS Poseidon – USS Poseidon: Phantom Below, 2005
 The Precious Gem – Fool's Gold, 2008
 SS Princess Irene (a ship that collides with an iceberg and sinks with a horrendous loss of life, with the death toll possibly greater than the sinking of the RMS Titanic) – History Is Made at Night, 1937
 Proteus – nuclear mini submarine from Fantastic Voyage, 1966
 Q Boat – Q's fishing boat, The World Is Not Enough, 1999
 Queen Anne's Revenge – Pirates of the Caribbean: On Stranger Tides, 2011
 Queen Conch – To Have and Have Not, 1944
 Rachel – Moby Dick, 1956, 1998
 Reaper – Dog's ship in Cutthroat Island, 1995
 Red Dragon – civilian yacht, Rush Hour 2, 2001
 Red October – The Hunt for Red October film with Sean Connery, 1990 (also in the 1984 Tom Clancy novel)
 Red Witch – Wake of the Red Witch with John Wayne, 1948
 Regent Queen – cruise ship in Chupacabra: Dark Seas, 2005
 USS Reluctant (AK-601) – World War II cargo ship in Mister Roberts (1955) and the 1984 television film (also appears in novel, play and TV series versions)
 Rights-of-Man – Billy Budd, 1962
 Rob Roy – commercial freighter, Windbag the Sailor, 1936
 SS Roland (based on a Norwegian ship , and the story of the film is inspired by the April 1912 sinking of the RMS Titanic)  – ocean liner, Atlantis, 1913
 HMS Saltash Castle – British Royal Navy frigate in The Cruel Sea, 1953
 USS San Pablo – The Sand Pebbles, 1966
 Santana – Key Largo, 1948 (also name of Bogart's personal sailing yacht)
 Sancta Helena a Frigate in Underworld: Evolution, 2006
 Saracen – yacht, Dead Calm, 1989
 USS Saratoga (CVN-88) – aircraft carrier, Godzilla, 2014
 USS Sawfish – On the Beach, 1959
 USS Scotia – submarine, 30,000 Leagues Under the Sea, 2007
 Sea Cliff – DSV in Raise the Titanic, 1980
 Sea Queen – sport-fishing boat in Breaking Point, 1950
 Sea Star – tug in Virus, 1999
 HMS Sea Tiger – British Royal Navy submarine, We Dive at Dawn, 1943
 USS Sea Tiger – World War II submarine, Operation Petticoat, 1959 (also the 1977 TV series)
 SS Sea Witch – Action in the North Atlantic, 1943
 SSNR Seaview – Voyage to the Bottom of the Sea with Walter Pidgeon, 1961
 HMS Shag at Sea – yacht, Austin Powers in Goldmember, 2002
 HMS Sherwood – British Royal Navy cruiser, Carry on Admiral, 1957
 IJN Shinaru – Japanese aircraft carrier, Torpedo Run, 1958
 Silent Mary – Pirates of the Caribbean: Dead Men Tell No Tales, 2017
 Skyline (天涯号) – Chinese cruise ship, The Precipice Game, 2016
 HMS Solent – British Royal Navy destroyer, Sink the Bismarck!, 1960
 Stealth Ship – media mogul Elliot Carver's secret news creator in Tomorrow Never Dies, 1997 (based on the real-life Sea Shadow (IX-529)
 SS Southern Queen – Setting for the first half of the Preston Sturges directed 1941 comedy The Lady Eve starring Henry Fonda and Barbara Stanwyck. It was also the name of the fictional cruise ship in the 1948 comedy Romance on the High Seas starring Doris Day.
 St. Georges – British spy ship trawler For Your Eyes Only, 1981
 USS Starfish – Hellcats of the Navy, 1957
 Starfish – DSV in Raise the Titanic, 1980
  – Balao-class submarine, Down Periscope, 1996 (no relation to the Salmon-class )
 HMS Surprise – British Royal Navy frigate, Master and Commander: The Far Side of the World, 2003
 HMS Sutherland – 74-gun ship of the line, Captain Horatio Hornblower, 1951
 Tasha – ocean liner, Anastasia, 1997
 USS Thunderfish – Operation Pacific with John Wayne, 1951
 USS Tigerfish (SSN 509) – United States nuclear submarine from Ice Station Zebra, 1968
 USS Tigershark – The Atomic Submarine, 1959
 SS Titanic II – fictional replica of the real-life , 2010
 Titanic III – based on the replica of the RMS Titanic, full of things from the original ship's passengers. On the maiden voyage, a person makes a heavy virtual, for the ghosts to recover everything back, general fitting. Until the new ship gains the same fate as the original RMS Titanic. Titanic 666, 2022
 HMS Torrin – In Which We Serve, 1942
 HMS Trumpton – British Royal Navy minesweeper in The Navy Lark, 1959
 Tsimtsum (ツィムツーム) – Japanese cargo ship, Life of Pi, 2012
 Tugboat Annie – Tugboat Annie, 1933 (portrayed by tugboat Arthur Foss)
 Turtle – DSV in Raise the Titanic, 1980
 U-571 – appears in U-571, 2000 (coincidentally the same number as German submarine U-571)
 Ulysses – submarine, Atlantis: The Lost Empire, 2001
 USS Ulysses – Los Angeles-class submarine in Crash Dive, 1996
 USS Utah (SSBN-745) – Ohio-class ballistic missile submarine in Godzilla, 1998
 USS Valhalla (SSN-905) – Los Angeles-class SSN in Rapid Assault, 1997
 HMS VengeanceBritish Royal Navy submarine in Johnny English Strikes Again, 2018
 SS Venture – King Kong, 1933, 2005
 SS Venture – cargo ship, The Lost World: Jurassic Park, 1997
 HMS Venus – British Royal Navy frigate, Carry On Jack, 1962
 HMS Victoria – British Royal Navy dreadnought, Britannic, 2000
 HMS Viperess – British Royal Navy Victor-class destroyer, The Cruel Sea, 1953
 The Wanderer – Captain Ron with Martin Short and Kurt Russell, 1992
 USS Wayne – US Navy nuclear submarine in the TV movie Assault on the Wayne, 1971
 USS Wayne (SSN-593) – US Navy nuclear submarine in the film The Spy Who Loved Me, 1977
 We're Here – Captains Courageous with Spencer Tracy, 1937
 Wonkatania – Willy Wonka & the Chocolate Factory, 1971 (also appears in 2005 adaptation), based on the Cunard Line tradition of ending ships with "-ia" (and playing off  and )
 Yellow Submarine – The Beatles' psychedelic submarine, 1968

Literature

Single works
 USS Abraham Lincoln – frigate in Twenty Thousand Leagues Under the Sea by Jules Verne, 1868
 African Queen – The African Queen by C. S. Forester, 1935
 Alice May – from the poem "The Cremation of Sam McGee" by Robert Service, 1907
 Anchises – One of Ours by Willa Cather, 1922
 HMS Antigone – Leander-class cruiser, The Cruiser by Warren Tute, 1955
 Arabella – Captain Blood by Rafael Sabatini, 1924
 Araby – tramp freighter in Captain of the Araby and other Tod Moran adventure novels, by Howard Pease, 1953
 Argo – Greek mythological ship in Argonautica, the original story of Jason and the Argonauts, by Apollonius Rhodius, 3rd century BCE
 Ariadne, yacht in I Was There, a short story by Nicholas Monsarrat in The Ship That Died of Shame and Other Stories, 1959
 Around the World in Eighty Days by Jules Verne, 1873
 Mongolia – steamer running from Brindisi to Suez and Bombay 
Rangoon – steamer running from Calcutta to Hong Kong
  – steamer taken by Passepartout from Hong Kong to Yokohama
 Tankadère – pilot boat chartered by Phileas Fogg between Hong Kong and Shanghai
 General Grant – steamer running from Yokohama to San Francisco 
 China – missed steamer running from New York to Liverpool 
 Henrietta – paddle steamer chartered by Phileas Fogg between New York and Bordeaux
 Artemis – Voyager by Diana Gabaldon, 1993
 HMS Artemis – The Ship by C. S. Forester, 1943
 Astrea – Roman galley ship, Ben-Hur by Genl Lew Wallace, 1880
 Auf Wiedersehen – sloop, Secret Sea by Robb White, 1947
 Aurora – ship in the Sherlock Holmes adventure The Sign of the Four by Arthur Conan Doyle, 1890
 Baalbek – Libyan freighter, Eagle Trap by Geoffrey Archer, 1993
 USS Barracuda (SSN-593) – U.S. Navy submarine in To Kill the Potemkin by Mark Joseph, 1986 
 USS Belinda (APA-22) – Away All Boats by Kenneth M. Dodson, 1954 (also appears in film version)
 Billy Budd by Herman Melville, 1924
 HMS Bellipotent
 HMS Indomitable
 Rights-of-Man
 Britannia – Captain Grant's ship in In Search of the Castaways by Jules Verne, 1867–1868
 HMS Broadsword – Royal Navy Destroyer, involved in an intentional incident in First Among Equals by Jeffrey Archer, 1984
 BRP Cagayan de Oro – Philippine Navy Whidbey Island-class LSD, Dragon Strike - The Millennium War by Humphrey Hawksley and Simon Holberton, 1997
USS Caine – destroyer minesweeper (DMS) in The Caine Mutiny by Herman Wouk, 1951 (also appears in film version)
 HMS Calypso – frigate, The Captain from Connecticut by C. S. Forester, 1941
 USS Carl Jackson – Nimitz-class aircraft carrier, Eagle Trap by Geoffrey Archer, 1993
 Centaur – racing ship captained by Sergestus in the Aeneid by Virgil, 1st century BCE
 Chimaera – racing ship captained by Gyas in the Aeneid by Virgil, 1st century BCE
 Claymore - corvette in Quatrevingt-Treize (93) by Victor Hugo, 1874
 HMS Compass Rose – corvette in The Cruel Sea by Nicholas Monsarrat, 1951
 Covenant – brig, Kidnapped by Robert Louis Stevenson, 1886
 Dazzler – sloop, The Cruise of the Dazzler by Jack London, 1902
 USS Delaware – frigate, The Captain from Connecticut by C. S. Forester, 1941
 Demeter – Russian schooner in Dracula by Bram Stoker, 1897
 USS Dolphin – submarine in Ice Station Zebra by Alistair MacLean, 1963
 USS Dragonfish – U.S. Navy submarine in both Raise the Titanic! by Clive Cussler, 1976, and To Kill the Potemkin by Mark Joseph, 1986 
 Dulcibella – The Riddle of the Sands by Erskine Childers, 1903
 Duncan – ocean yacht, In Search of the Castaways by Jules Verne, 1867
 USS Eel – submarine in Run Silent, Run Deep (1955) and Dust on the Sea (1972) by Edward L. Beach Jr.
 Erasmus  - A Dutch pinnace piloted by John Blackthorne in James A. Michener's Shōgun, 1975
 Erebus – Alaska by James A. Michener, 1988
 Fenton – lugger, The Narrow Corner by W. Somerset Maugham, 1932
 Fin of God – Omnian ship, Small Gods by Terry Pratchett, 1992
 USS Fletcher (DDG-1005) – U.S. Navy Zumwalt-class guided missile destroyer featured in The Backup Asset by Leslie Wolfe, 2015
 The Fuwalda – ship which took Tarzans's parents to Africa, Tarzan of the Apes by Edgar Rice Burroughs, 1914
 Ghost – sealing schooner, The Sea Wolf by Jack London, 1904
 SS Gigantic - S.S. Gigantic Across the Atlantic (based on the sinking of the RMS Titanic, by Peter Selgin, 1999
 The Glen Carrig – from the horror novel The Boats of the "Glen Carrig" by William Hope Hodgson, 1907
 Großadmiral Dönitz – Kriegsmarine nuclear submarine, Fatherland by Robert Harris, 1992
 Großadmiral Raeder – Kriegsmarine aircraft carrier, Fatherland by Robert Harris, 1992
 The Hesperus – from the poem "The Wreck of the Hesperus" by Henry Wadsworth Longfellow, 1842
 Hispaniola - Treasure Island by Robert Louis Stevenson, 1883
 Hoptoad – from the novel "Pippi in the South Seas" by Astrid Lindgren, 1948
 Ilya Podogin – Soviet SSN, Icebound by Dean Koontz, 1995
 USS Independence – fictional Wasp-class amphibious assault ship where a large part of The Swarm by Frank Schätzing takes place, 2004
 Indra – schooner, Secret Sea by Robb White, 1947
 HMS Iphigenia – frigate, The Fighting Temeraire by John Winton, 1971
 The Iron Pirate (The Nameless Ship) in the 1893 novel The Iron Pirate: A Plain Tale of Strange Happenings on the Sea by Max Pemberton. The ship's captain, Captain Black, has a submarine in Pemberton's 1911 sequel.
 USS James T Doig – destroyer, The Fighting Temeraire by John Winton, 1971
 Janet Coombe – from the novel The Loving Spirit by Daphne du Maurier, 1931 
 Jolly Roger – Captain Hook's pirate ship, Peter Pan by J. M. Barrie, 1904
 USS Keeling – codename "Greyhound", in The Good Shepherd by C. S. Forester, 1955
 Korund – Tango-class submarine, Eagle Trap by Geoffrey Archer, 1993
 USS Langley – a Forrestal-class aircraft carrier, The Sixth Battle by Barrett Tillman, 1992
The Last Ship by William Brinkley, 1988
  (DDG-80), the first nuclear powered Arleigh Burke class guided-missile destroyer (By the time the TV series of the same name was produced in 2014, the  had been commissioned as DDG-80 with destroyers up to at least DDG-120 awarded, so was renumbered as DDG-151).
 Pushkin – a Russian ballistic missile submarine that also survived the nuclear attack
 Leif Ericson – The Illuminatus! Trilogy by Robert Shea and Robert Anton Wilson, 1975
 HMS Leviathan – aircraft carrier,  by John Winton, 1967
 USS Levant - corvette in The Man Without a Country by Edward Everett Hale, 1863
 Liberian Star – Snakehead, of the Alex Rider series by Anthony Horowitz, 2007
 USS Mako – U.S. Navy submarine in To Kill the Potemkin by Mark Joseph, 1986 
 HMS Mallard – corvette, A Flock of Ships by Brian Callison, 1986
 Marie Celeste – from the short story J. Habakuk Jephson's Statement by Arthur Conan Doyle, 1884 (the real ship was Mary Celeste)
 Mary Deare – The Wreck of the Mary Deare by Hammond Innes, 1956
 M.G.B. 1087, motor gunboat in The Ship That Died of Shame, a short story by Nicholas Monsarrat in The Ship That Died of Shame and Other Stories, 1959
 Milka – Jingo by Terry Pratchett, 1997 (name parodies the Pinta)
 Moby-Dick by Herman Melville, 1851
 Pequod - the American whaling ship searching for Moby-Dick
 Bouton de Rose - French whaler with ambergris
 Jeroboam - a plague ship
 Rachel - an American whaling ship that finds Ishmael
 Samuel Enderby - British whaler captained by Boomer
 Mortzestus – horror novel The Ghost Pirates by William Hope Hodgson, 1909
 Nautilus – Twenty Thousand Leagues Under the Sea (1870) and The Mysterious Island (1874) by Jules Verne
 Nellie (presumably for one of the Nelsons in British service) – Heart of Darkness by Joseph Conrad, 1899
 Not for Hire – paddle-wheel steamboat in The Fabulous Riverboat by Philip José Farmer, 1971
 Numestra del Oro – armed merchantman owned by a Colombian cartel, Hammerheads by Dale Brown, 1990
 USS Okinawa (LHD-10) – U.S. Navy Wasp-class (LHD) Landing Helicopter Dock / amphibious assault ship featured in The Ghost Pattern by Leslie Wolfe, 2015
 HMS Orcus – Oberon-class submarine, Submarine by John Wingate, 1982
 HMS Pandora – frigate, One of Our Warships by John Winton, 1975
 Pacific Klondike – deep ocean drillship based on the Glomar Explorer - Fireplay by William Wingate, 1977
 PC-237 – U.S. Navy patrol craft, Secret Sea by Robb White, 1947
 Penguin – The Narrative of Arthur Gordon Pym of Nantucket by Edgar Allan Poe, 1838
 Pharaon – the ship on which Edmond Dantès first sailed in The Count of Monte Cristo by Alexandre Dumas, 1844
 Pocahontas – The Good Soldier by Ford Madox Ford, 1915
 Polar Star - The Soviet factory ship in Polar Star by Martin Cruz Smith, 1989
 SS Poseidon – ocean liner (based on the ), The Poseidon Adventure by Paul Gallico, 1969
 Pristis – racing ship captained by Mnestheus in the Aeneid by Virgil, 1st century BCE
 USS Pyramus – Polaris missile-carrying SSBN, The Deep Silence by Douglas Reeman, 1967
 The Pyrates by George MacDonald Fraser, 1983
 Grenouille Frénétique (Frantic Frog) – pirate ship
 Laughing Sandbag – pirate ship
 Plymouth Corporation's Revenge – pirate ship
 Rocketing Spitfire – sloop
 Santa Cascara (later HMS Golden Vanity) – Spanish galleon captured by the British
 Santa Umbriago – Spanish warship
 Twelve Apostles – passenger ship
 Queequeg – The Grim Grotto by Lemony Snicket, 2004
 Queen Anne, ocean liner in Oh To Be In England, a short story by Nicholas Monsarrat in The Ship That Died of Shame and Other Stories, 1959
 The Ramchunder – an East Indiaman, Captain Bragg, in Vanity Fair by William Makepeace Thackeray, 1847–1848
The Hunt for Red October by Tom Clancy, 1984
 Red October (Krasniy Oktyabr) – The new Soviet Typhoon-class ballistic missile submarine commanded by defecting Captain Marko Ramius
 Vladimir Konovalov - A Soviet Alfa-class attack submarine hunting Red October
  - An actual US Navy attack submarine also shadowing Red October
 Red Witch – Wake of the Red Witch by Garland Roark, 1946
 USS Reluctant (AK-601) – World War II cargo ship in Mister Roberts by Thomas Heggen, 1946 (also appears in play, film and TV series versions)
 Sable Lorcha – lorcha, The Sable Lorcha by Horace Hazeltine, 1912
 HMS Saltash – frigate in The Cruel Sea by Nicholas Monsarrat, 1951 (HMS Saltash Castle in the film)
 USS San Pablo – The Sand Pebbles by Richard McKenna, 1962
 Santa Ybel – Spanish treasure ship, Secret Sea by Robb White, 1947
 HMS Saturn – Swiftsure-class sub, The Saturn Experiment by Peter Shepherd, 1988
 USS Savo - aircraft carrier in The Bridges at Toko-ri by James A. Michener, 1953
 USS Scorpion – On the Beach by Nevil Shute, 1957
 Scylla – racing ship captained by Cloanthus in the Aeneid by Virgil, 1st century BCE
 USS Sea Trench – Aquarius Mission by Martin Caidin, 1978
 The Sea Witch – yacht, The Wreck of the Mary Deare by Hammond Innes, 1956
 USOS Seaview – Voyage to the Bottom of the Sea by Theodore Sturgeon, 1961
 Shark – destroyer, Black August by Dennis Wheatley, 1934
  – British destroyer, The Guns of Navarone (novel) by Alistair MacLean, 1957 (The actual HMS Sirdar was a submarine)
 Siren – yacht, A Damsel in Distress by P. G. Wodehouse, 1919
 Slewfoot - the crew's nickname for a PT boat whose number is never given, in Torpedo Run by Robb White, 1962
 Speranza – Arrival and Departure by Arthur Koestler, 1943
 Spirit of the Hudson - a riverboat casino in Backflash by Donald E. Westlake writing as Richard Stark, 1998
 USS Starbuck (SSN-989) – Pacific Vortex! by Clive Cussler, 1983 (Cover of Sphere edition shows SSN-107 on the fin)
 USS Stingray – U.S. Navy submarine in To Kill the Potemkin by Mark Joseph, 1986
 USS Stormy Beach – Long Beach-class cruiser, Fireplay by William Wingate, 1977
 USS Swordfish – On the Beach by Nevil Shute, 1957
 HMS Sybaris – British heavy cruiser, The Guns of Navarone (novel) by Alistair MacLean, 1957
Tai-pan by James Clavell, 1966
 Struan & Company
China Cloud - 22 gun China Clipper, flagship of Struan & Co
Blue Cloud - Clipper - Struan's ships are all named for his mother whose maiden name was McCloud
Resting Cloud - Hulk - Struan's HQ prior to the establishment of British Hong Kong
Scarlet Cloud - lost ship, nearly precipitating Struan's bankruptcy
Thunder Cloud - Struan's record setting first ship to arrive in Hong Kong from London after the establishment of British Hong Kong
 Royal Navy
 HMS Vengeance - 74 gun flagship of the East Indies and China Station, based on the 
 HMS Mermaid - 22 gun Sloop-of-war under the command of Captain Glessing
 HMS Nemesis - the first Steam frigate to make the journey from London to Hong Kong, based on the 
Other Ships
White Witch - 22 gun China Clipper, flagship of Brock & Sons
Gray Witch - Clipper under the command of Brock's son Gorth
Princess of Alabama - 20 gun brig, flagship of Cooper & Tillman
Vagrant Star - an East Indiaman in which Struan and Brock met prior to the events in Tai-pan
 USS Tallahatchie County – U.S. Navy submarine tender in To Kill the Potemkin by Mark Joseph, 1986 
 HMS Téméraire – Polaris nuclear submarine, The Fighting Temeraire by John Winton, 1971
 USS Thomas Jefferson – Nimitz Class by Patrick Robinson, 1997
  – The War of the Worlds by H. G. Wells, 1897
 SS Titan – Futility, or the Wreck of the Titan by Morgan Robertson (A fictional story that is very similar to the real life of the sinking of the RMS Titanic 14 years later in 1912), 1898
 HMS Tristram - submarine in His Majesty's U-Boat by Douglas Reeman, 1973
 U-174 – Kriegsmarine U-boat, Fatherland by Robert Harris, 1992
 U-996 – Kriegsmarine U-boat, An Operational Necessity by Gwyn Griffin, 1967
 HMS Ulysses – HMS Ulysses, by Alistair MacLean, 1955
 SS Valparaiso – Godhead Trilogy by James Morrow, 1994–1999
 USS Vindicator (NMSS-3) – nuclear-powered strategic missile battleship, Fire Lance by David Mace, 1986
 Vingilot – The Silmarillion by J. R. R. Tolkien and Christopher Tolkien, 1977
 HMS Vortex – destroyer in The Admiral by Warren Tute, 1963
 The Walrus – Flint's pirate ship in Treasure Island by Robert Louis Stevenson, 1883
 USS Walrus – submarine in Run Silent, Run Deep by Edward L. Beach Jr., 1955
 We're Here – Captains Courageous: A Story of the Grand Banks, by Rudyard Kipling, 1897
 HMS Winger — from Corvette Command by Nicholas Monsarrat (based on the real )

Series
A Song of Ice and Fire series by George R.R. Martin
Ironborn
Black Wind
Dagger
Dagon's Feast
Esgred
Fingerdancer
Foamdrinker
Forlorn Hope
Golden Storm
Great Kraken
Grey Ghost
Grief
Hardhand
Iron Lady
Iron Vengeance
Iron Victory
Iron Wind
Iron Wing
Kite
Kraken's Kiss
Lamentation
Leviathan
Lord Dagon
Lord Quellon
Lord Vickon
Helldiver
Maiden's Bane
Nightflyer
Reapers Wind
Red Jester
Red Tide
Salty Wench
Sea Bitch
Sea Song
Seven Skulls
Shark
Silence
Silverfin
Sparrowhawk
Swiftin
Thrall's Bane
Thunderer
Warhammer
Warrior Wench
White Widow
Woe
The Royal Fleet (Baratheon)
Fury
King Robert's Hammer
Lady Lyanna
Lionstar
Seaswift
Lannister
Brave Joffrey
Golden Rose
Lady Joanna
Lady Olenna
Lioness
Lord Renly
Lord Tywin
Princess Marcella
Queen Margaery
Sweet Cersei
 Aubrey–Maturin series by Patrick O'Brian
 HMS Diane
 Franklin — privateer
 HEICS Niobe
 USS Norfolk
 Nutmeg of Consolation
 HM Polychrest — sloop
 HM Sophie — sloop
 HMS Worcester
 Axis of Time trilogy by John Birmingham
 USS Amanda Garrett
 Dessaix
 HMS Fearless
 HMAS Havoc
 USS Hillary Clinton — aircraft carrier
 HMAS Ipswich
 USS Kandahar
 USS Kennebunkport
 USS Leyte Gulf
 HMAS Moreton Bay
 KRI Nuku
 USS Providence
 JDS Siranui
 KRI Sutanto
 HMS Trident
 Biggles series by W. E. Johns
 SS Alice Clair — British merchant ship
 Benegal Star — tramp steamer
 Colonia — British merchant ship
 Dundee Castle — British merchant ship
 Queen of Olati — British steamship
 HMS Seafret — British destroyer
 Shanodah — British merchant ship
 Tasman — Australian merchant ship
 Bloody Jack series by Louis A. Meyer
 Belle of the Golden West
 Bloodhound
 HMS Dolphin
 Emerald
 HMS Hope
 HMS Juno
 Nancy B. Alsop
 HMS Wolverine
 Bolitho series by Alexander Kent
 HMS Achates
 HMS Argonaute
 HMS Athena
 HM Avenger — cutter
 HMS Destiny
 HMS Euryalus
 Golden Plover
 HMS Gorgon
 HMS Hyperion
 Nautilus — French frigate
 HMS Onward
 HMS Phalarope
 HM Sparrow — sloop
 HMS Tempest
 HMS Trojan
 HMS Undine
 HMS Unrivalled
 The Chronicles of Narnia series by C. S. Lewis
 Dawn Treader
 Splendor Hyaline
 The Chronicles of Thomas Covenant by Stephen R. Donaldson
 Starfare's Gem
 Discworld by Terry Pratchett
 The Boat - Ankh-Morporkian submarine
 Fin of God - Omnian naval vessel
 Indestructible - Ankh-Morporkian commandeered naval vessel
 Indolence - Ankh-Morporkian commandeered naval vessel
 Mary-Jane - Ankh-Morporkian naval vessel
 Milka - Ankh-Morporkian trading vessel
 Ocean Waltzer 
 Prid of Ankh-Morpork - Ankh-Morporkian commandeered naval vessel
 Queen of Quirm - Quirmian paddleship
 Roberta E. Biscuit - Quirmian paddleship
 Unnamed - unregistered trading vessel
 Wonderful Fanny - Quirmian paddleship
 Dray Prescot series by Kenneth Bulmer (as Alan Burt Akers)
 HMS Rockingham
 Earthsea Trilogy by Ursula K. Le Guin
 Lookfar — Ged's boat, formerly called Sanderling
 Edward Mainwaring series by Victor Suthren
 HMS Pallas
 Fafhrd and the Gray Mouser series by Fritz Leiber
 Black Treasurer
Flashman series by George MacDonald Fraser
Balliol College – slave-trader
 Harry Potter series by J. K. Rowling
 The Durmstrang ship
 Heroes of Olympus by Rick Riordan
 Argo II
 Horatio Hornblower series by C. S. Forester
 
 
 Estrella
 
 
 
 Mejidieh
 Natividad
 
 HM Retribution — sloop
 Speedwell
 
 
 Inheritance Cycle series by Christopher Paolini
 The Dragon Wing
 Jack Ryan universe series by Tom Clancy
 E.S. Politovsky – Soviet Alfa-class submarine
 Red October – Soviet Typhoon-class submarine
 V.K. Konovalov – Soviet Alfa-class submarine
 USCGC Panache – sole example of new class of high endurance cutter
 JS Mutsu – Japanese-built destroyer generally similar to American Arleigh Burke class
 Jake Grafton series by Stephen Coonts
 Flight of the Intruder, 1986
 USS Shiloh - aircraft carrier (One former and one current US Navy ships share that name, neither of them an aircraft carrier)
 The Intruders, 1994
 USS Columbia - aircraft carrier (Seven former, one current, and one future US Navy ships share that name, none of them an aircraft carrier)
 Reduktor - Soviet intelligence ship
 Final Flight, 1988
 USS United States -  (A US Navy aircraft carrier was to have had that name, but the ship was cancelled)
 America, 2001
 USS America - Nuclear-powered attack submarine (Three former and one current US Navy ships share that name, none of them a submarine)
 Lord Ramage series by Dudley Pope
 HMS Calypso
 HMS Dido
 HMS Jocasta
 HM Triton — brig
 John Fury series by G. S. Beard
 HMS Amazon — British 32-gun frigate
 Bedford — merchantman
 Earl of Mornington — East India Company 24-gun warship
 Magicienne — French frigate
 Otter — East India Company 18-gun warship
 HMS Wasp — British brigantine
 Nathaniel Drinkwater series by Richard Woodman
 HMS Antigone — former French frigate
 HM Hellebore — brig
 HM Kestrel — cutter
 HMS Melusine
 HMS Patrician
 Vestal — paddle-steamer
 HM Virago — bomb-vessel
 Oz series by L. Frank Baum, Ruth Plumly Thompson et al.
 Crescent Moon
 Para Handy series by Neil Munro
 Vital Spark
 Paul Gallant series by Victor Suthren
 Echo — corvette
 Sherlock Holmes series by Arthur Conan Doyle
 The Gloria Scott
 "The Five Orange Pips"
 Lone Star
 "The Cardboard Box"
 Conqueror (Liverpool and London Line)
 May Day (Liverpool and London Line)
 "The Adventure of Black Peter"
 Sea Unicorn — whaler
 Southern Victory series by Harry Turtledove
 CSS Bonefish – Confederate submarine, The Great War: Walk in Hell
 USS Chapultepec – aircraft carrier, The Great War: American Front
 USS Dakota – U.S. battleship, The Great War: American Front
 CSS Fort Sumter – Confederate cruiser, The Great War: American Front
 CSS Hot Springs – destroyer escort in the Second Great War
 USS Josephus Daniels – destroyer escort in Second Great War
 USS Oregon – battleship in Second Great War
 USS Pocahantas, Arkansas – troop transport named after one of the rare U.S. victories in the Second Mexican War
 USS Punishment – U.S. river monitor operating on the Mississippi, The Great War: Walk in Hell
 USS Remembrance — aircraft carrier
 Ripple – U.S. fishing boat, The Great War: American Front
 USS Sandwich Islands
 CSS Scallop – Confederate submarine, The Great War: American Front
 Spray – U.S. fishing trawler / Q-ship, The Great War: American Front
 CSS Swamp Fox – Confederate commerce raider, The Great War: American Front
 USS Trenton – aircraft carrier
 CSS Whelk – Confederate submarine, The Great War: American Front
 Swallows and Amazons series by Arthur Ransome

 Travis McGee series by John D. MacDonald
 Busted Flush – Travis McGee's houseboat
 HooBoy — charter fishing boat
 John Maynard Keynes – Meyer's first houseboat
 Munequita — McGee's speedboat
 Thorstein Veblen – Meyer's second houseboat
 Zion Chronicles series by Bodie Thoene
 Ave Maria
 Clive Cussler works
 First Attempt—in The Mediterranean Caper and Raise the Titanic!
 Oregon, Juan Cabrillo's base-ship in Oregon Files series

Norse mythology
 Hringhorni – the ship of Baldr
 Naglfar – ship in Norse mythology made of the fingernails and toenails of the dead
 Skíðblaðnir – the ship of Freyr

Biblical
 Ark – Noah's ship

Radio
 Empress of Coconut – Potarneyland cruise liner, The Navy Lark
 HMS Goliath – British stealth nuclear submarine, Deep Trouble
 HMS Makepeace – British destroyer, The Navy Lark
 Marie Valette – 18th-century ship sunk in the English Channel, The Navy Lark
 Poppadum – Potarneyland frigate, The Navy Lark
 Saucy Seagull – British fishing trawler, The Navy Lark
 The Scarlet Queen – ketch, Voyage of the Scarlet Queen, 1947 radio serial
 HMS Troutbridge – British frigate, The Navy Lark

Stage
 Flying Dutchman – in the 1843 opera Der fliegende Holländer (The Flying Dutchman by Richard Wagner) and other plays, movies and novels
 , 1878 by Gilbert and Sullivan
 USS Reluctant (AK-601) – Mister Roberts (also appears in novel, films, and TV series versions)

Television
 USS Allegiance – U.S. Navy fast-attack submarine from The X-Files episode "End Game"
 HMAS Ambush – Patrol Boat
 USS Ardent – U.S. Navy destroyer escort from The X-Files episode "Død Kalm"
 Argonaut – Mike Nelson's boat in Sea Hunt, 1950s series
 Batboat – Batman
 Black Rock - A fully rigged 19th-century British trading ship that was found shipwrecked on the Island and overgrown by the jungle, Lost
 SS Bernice – cargo ship in the Doctor Who serial Carnival of Monsters
 Black Pig – Captain Pugwash, UK children's TV cartoon series
 Childish Tycoon – Community
 SS Claridon – ocean liner (based on the ) in Ghost Whisperer
 HMAS Defiance – Patrol Boat
 USS Georgetown – Supercarrier, 1988
 Golden Lolly – pirate ship, Henry's Cat
 Gone Fission – Mr. Burns' yacht in The Simpsons
 Greasy Fleece – pirate ship, Henry's Cat
  – Sea Patrol
 Haunted Star – General Hospital
 HMS Hero (F42) – Warship
HMAS Kingston – Sea Patrol
 USS Kiwi – The Wackiest Ship in the Army
 SS Lady Anne – cruise ship, "Passage on the Lady Anne" episode of The Twilight Zone
 SS Andrea I (based on the ) - ocean liner from Brazilian telenovela Terra Nostra (Our Land), 1999
 Lake Wallenpaupack Princess – excursion / tour boat, The Office
 Leaking Lena – Captain Hufenpuf's ship, Beany and Cecil
 USS Lexington – US aircraft carrier in "The Mission", episode 5 of Designated Survivor
 HMS Lindana – sloop, Phineas and Ferb
 SS Maid of Plygh – freight ship, Jane
 USS Massachusetts – 24: Live Another Day
 S. S. Minnow – Gilligan's Island
 S.S. Minnow II – Rescue from Gilligan's Island
 SS Moldavia – passenger ship, You Rang, M'Lord?
 USS Monroe (DD-211) – The Pretender Together – 
SS Albatroz (based on the ) - ocean liner colliding with an iceberg from Brazilian telenovela O Tempo Não Para (English: Crashing Into the Future), 2018
 USS Nathan James (DDG-151) – The Last Ship
 Naughty Jane – rowboat, Dad's Army
 HMS Peerless – Royal Navy Anti-submarine warfare ship serving in the British Pacific Fleet on which Albert Gladstone Trotter served, sunk in a collision with USS Pittsburgh. Mention in Only Fools and Horses episode Dates
 Persephone – log salvage boat from The Beachcombers
 Piper Maru – French ship from The X-Files episode "Piper Maru"
 USS Pittsburgh – U.S. Navy aircraft carrier mentioned in Only Fools and Horses episode Dates. Picked up survivors from HMS Peerless after the latter was lost in a collision with the ship.
 RMS Princess Isabella (based on the RMS Queen Mary 2) – 10.5: Apocalypse
 PT-73 – the PT boat from McHale's Navy
 PT-116 – McHale's Navy
 SS Queen of Glasgow – passenger ship, "Judgment Night" episode of The Twilight Zone
 Queen's Gambit – Arrow
 USS Reluctant (AK-601) – World War II cargo ship in Mister Roberts (also appears in novel, play and film versions)
 USS Sea Spanker – aircraft carrier, from the "New Kids on the Blecch" episode of The Simpsons
 seaQuest DSV 4600 – seaQuest DSV
 USOS Seaview – Voyage to the Bottom of the Sea
 Skydiver – UFO, 1970–1971
 Slice of Life – Dexter
 Stingray – WASP submarine in Stingray, 1964–1965
 St. Vitus Dance – Sonny Crockett's houseboat from Miami Vice
 Sultana – The Buccaneers, 1956
 RMS Sunshine – setting for the BBC television variety programme Cabaret Cruise, 193749
SS Royal (based on the ) - Ocean Liner from Brazilian telenovela Tempo de Amar (English title: A Time to Love), 2017
 Temperance  – Bones
 Thunder – super speedboat in Thunder in Paradise, 1994
 Thunderbird 4 – Thunderbirds, 1964
 Tiki III – schooner in Adventures in Paradise, 1960s series by James Michener
 SS Tiny Tub – rented tugboat from Tiny Toon Adventures episode "No Toon Is an Island"
 SS Tipton – The Suite Life on Deck
 Unnamed ghost ship – from SpongeBob SquarePants, where the Flying Dutchman lives
 Vast Explorer – Adventure Inc., 2003§
 SS Vondel – passenger ship in The Young Indiana Jones Chronicles, sunk in a pirate attack
 Bárbara de Braganza (based on Cunard-White Star Line's ships  and ) - ocean liner from High Seas
 USS Walter Mondale – laundry ship from The Simpsons, mentioned in the episode "Bart vs. Australia"
 X-2 – hydrofoil in The Venture Bros.
 Zuko's Fire Nation ship – Avatar: The Last Airbender

Multiple ships by series
 Horatio Hornblower
  – 20-gun sloop
  – 74-gun ship-of-the-line
 Le Rève – French sloop
 Papillion – French frigate
 JAG / NCIS universe (many ships)
 Last Resort universe
 USS Colorado (SSBN-753) – fictional Ohio-class ballistic missile submarine
 USS Patrick Lawrence (DDG-112) – fictional Arleigh Burke-class guided missile destroyer
 The Last Ship Universe
 HMS Achilles (Hull Number Unknown) – fictional Astute-class nuclear-powered fleet submarine, The Last Ship, 2015
 USS Hayward (DDG-157) – fictional Arleigh Burke-class guided missile destroyer, The Last Ship, 2016
 USS Nathan James (DDG-151) – fictional Arleigh Burke-class guided missile destroyer, The Last Ship, 2014
 USS Shackleton (DDG-162) – fictional Arleigh Burke-class guided missile destroyer, The Last Ship, 2016
 USNS Solace (T-AH-21) – fictional Mercy-class hospital ship, The Last Ship, 2015
 RFS Vyerni (Hull Number Unknown) – fictional Kirov-class battlecruiser, The Last Ship, 2014
 The Onedin Line series
 Anne Onedin – steamship, portrayed in the series by the schooner Charlotte Rhodes with a false funnel, wheelhouse amidships, and aft deckhouse
 Charlotte Rhodes – first ship of James Onedin (This was in fact an actual schooner named "Charlotte Rhodes", née "Meta Jan", née "Eva". In 1979 it was destroyed at Amsterdam harbour by arson.)
 Medusa
 Pampero
 Soren Larsen (This was in fact an actual ship, a brigantine, and is still sailing today out of New Zealand.)
 Vigil
 HMS Archer 
 HMS Audacious
 USS Delaware
 Mhairi Finnea  – Scottish fishing trawler
 HMS Riffa
 HMS Vanguard  – British  
 HMS Vanquish  – British  
 HMS Vigil  – British  
 HMS Virtue  – British

Video games
 MS Amphitrite – cruise ship in Death by Degrees
 OFS Andromeda – AGTR Ship based upon the Raleigh-Class, featured in Ace Combat 5: The Unsung War, used for intelligence-gathering purposes
 Annabelle – LNG tanker in Resident Evil 7: Biohazard
 SS Anne – ocean liner in Pokémon Red, Blue, and Yellow
 Antaeus – "adaptive cruiser" in Hostile Waters: Antaeus Rising
 Alicorn (SAC-900) –  submersible aviation cruiser featured in Ace Combat 7: Skies Unknown
 Arsenal Gear – submersible mobile fortress from Metal Gear Solid 2: Sons of Liberty
 MS Artanic, HMT Maranic, MS Ceranic, MS Queen Amy, MS Artania, MS Mautania – Motor ship vessels run by a virtual shipping company named Laurentic Star Line in Blockland (this is a parody of the White Star Line's Olympic-class ocean liners.
 USS Barack Obama (CVN-08) – Call of Duty: Black Ops II
 Beluga – Hatakaze-class destroyer of the Aegir Fleet, featured in Ace Combat 04: Shattered Skies
 Beowolf π and Beowolf ν – two Los Angeles-class submarines of the Aegir Fleet, featured in Ace Combat 04: Shattered Skies
 USS Blackhawk – a nuclear submarine in Codename: Iceman
 Blackwyche – Sir Arthur Pendragon's ship in Sea of Thieves
 Borealis – abandoned ship in Half-Life 2: Episode Two and Portal 2
 C-3208 – cargo ship in Jurassic Park: The Game
 Calypso – cruise ship in Secret Files 2: Puritas Cordis
 Charon – cargo ship in Max Payne
 USS Clarence E. Walsh (CG-80) – guided-missile cruiser from Splinter Cell: Chaos Theory
 USS Conquest – nuclear submarine, Just Cause 4
USS Constellation (CVN-76) – aircraft carrier, Army of Two 
USS Constitution (CVN-80) – aircraft carrier, Crysis
MS CURIE – abandoned submersible research vessel in SOMA
 USS Daedalus (CVN-88) – nuclear-powered supercarrier from Command & Conquer: Generals – Zero Hour
 Dagat Ahas – Philippine (Oceana Cooperative Union) naval fortress ship in Front Mission 3
 Daisy Cruiser – Mario Kart: Double Dash, Mario Kart 7, and Mario Super Sluggers, also seen in Mario Kart Wii, Mario Kart 8 and Mario Kart 8 Deluxe, and in Mario Kart Arcade GP and Mario Kart Arcade GP 2
 Eastern Spirit – decommissioned Russian whaler rebuilt to serve as a supply ship and secondary laboratory in Cold Fear
Eminent Domain – Pacific Federation super-battleship from Project Wingman
 Elisabeth Dane – small cargo ship in Vampire: The Masquerade – Bloodlines
 HMS Endurance – science vessel in Tomb Raider
 Eva's Hammer – large Kriegsmarine nuclear submarine from Wolfenstein: The New Order
 Fenris – Hatakaze-class destroyer of the Aegir Fleet, featured in Ace Combat 04: Shattered Skies
 SS Flavion – Paper Mario: The Thousand-Year Door
 Folkvangr and Fensalir – Dragonet-class ballistic missile submarines featured in Ace Combat 2 and Ace Combat: Assault Horizon Legacy
 USS Freedom (CVN-83) – Gerald R. Ford-class nuclear-powered aircraft carrier in ArmA III
 Gangplank Galleon – Donkey Kong Country series
 General Skiseava – sentient battleship that guards the Q-Stein Empire's shores in Seek and Destroy
 Geofon – Kitty Hawk-class aircraft carrier belonging to the Aegir Fleet of the Federal Erusian Navy, featured in Ace Combat 04: Shattered Skies
 Hrimfaxi – aircraft carrier submarine featured in Ace Combat 5: The Unsung War
 Jackdaw – Edward Kenway's pirate ship in Assassin's Creed IV: Black Flag
 Jericho – abandoned cargo ship in Detroit: Become Human
 MS Jewel of the Pacific – cruise ship in World War Z (based on the real-life Oasis of the Seas)
 Jolly Roger's ship – Super Mario 64
 OFS Kestrel – Nimitz-class aircraft carrier in Ace Combat 5: The Unsung War and Ace Combat Zero: The Belkan War
 USS Khe Sanh (LHD-9) – Wasp-class amphibious assault ship from ARMA 2
 The Killer Whale – Merrick's ship in Sea of Thieves
 RMS King Weenzer (It is inspired by the Cunard's ships ,  and ) – ocean liner in Septentrion: Out of the Blue
 Kolga – Hatakaze-class destroyer of the Aegir Fleet, featured in Ace Combat 04: Shattered Skies
 Lady Vengeance – Divinity: Original Sin II
USS Las Cruces (SSBN-728) – The Terminator: SkyNET
 Lazuli – Hatakaze-class destroyer of the Aegir Fleet, featured in Ace Combat 04: Shattered Skies
 USS Liberator (CVN-81) – U.S. aircraft carrier, Call of Duty: Ghosts

 USS Liberty (LHD-69) – amphibious assault ship in Grand Theft Auto: San Andreas
 USS Luxington (ATT-16) – Nimitz-class aircraft carrier in Grand Theft Auto V and Grand Theft Auto Online
 MV Octopus – bulk carrier in Grand Theft Auto IV, Grand Theft Auto V and Grand Theft Auto Online
 MV The Sea Urchin – bulk carrier in Grand Theft Auto V and Grand Theft Auto Online
 SS Bulker – Panamax-class container ship in Grand Theft Auto V and Grand Theft Auto Online
 SS Daisy Lee – Panamax-class container ship in Grand Theft Auto V and Grand Theft Auto Online
 SS Ocean Motion – Panamax-class container ship in Grand Theft Auto V and Grand Theft Auto Online
 USS Liberty – destroyer, ArmA III
 SS Libra – cargo ship in Pokémon XD: Gale of Darkness
 SS Lorelei – cargo transport which was scuttled in Syphon Filter 3 and later vaporised with a nuke in Syphon Filter: The Omega Strain
 Luna Lucura – cargo vessel in Chaos Island: The Lost World
 MS Lydia – ocean liner in The Raven: Legacy of a Master Thief
 USS Maine (CVN-82) – aircraft carrier, Crysis: Warhead
 Maria Doria (At first, the Maria Doria would be based on the RMS Titanic, but the idea was scrapped. The Maria Doria is based on the ) – Tomb Raider 2
 Magpie's Fortune – The Pirate Lord's first ship in Sea of Thieves
 Magpie's Wing – The Pirate Lord's second ship in Sea of Thieves
 Marie Elena – pirate ship in The Elder Scrolls IV: Oblivion
 Maria Narcissa – freighter featured in the second story mission of Splinter Cell: Chaos Theory
 Marigold – Kirov-class battlecruiser in Ace Combat 6: Fires of Liberation
 Morningstar – Eli Slate's ship in Sea of Thieves
 Morrigan – Shay Patrick Cormac's ship in Assassin's Creed Rogue
Obra Dinn – English East Indiaman turned ghost ship which serves as the setting of Return of the Obra Dinn
 SS Orpheus (based on the RMS Berengaria, and after  and ) – ocean liner from Echo Night
 Outer Haven – submersible battleship from Metal Gear Solid 4: Guns of the Patriots
 Palanquin Ship – floating ghost ship in Touhous Undefined Fantastic Object
 Pearl – Soviet freighter that sank in 1951 whilst assigned to the top-secret E99 project in Singularity
 MS Princess of Fearless – cruise liner in Crisis Beat
 MS Queen Zenobia, MS Queen Semiramis and MS Queen Dido (based on the RMS Queen Elizabeth 2 and most modern cruise ships) – three cruise liners operated by the Paraguas Line Company, featured in Resident Evil: Revelations
 USS Ravenswood – coast guard ship in Cold Fear
 MS Rei di Tutto – Italian cruise ship in Tom Clancy's Rainbow Six: Rogue Spear
 Riken – Canadian whaleship hulk in The Long Dark
 USS Riptide – dilapidated U.S. Navy tug boat in Fallout 4
 SS Royale – party boat in Party Hard
 Rusalka – Soviet cargo ship hiding a numbers station in Call of Duty: Black Ops
 Salty Hippo – Captain Blubber's ship in the Banjo-Kazooie series of games
 Scinfaxi – aircraft carrier submarine featured in Ace Combat 5: The Unsung War
 Seagallop – ferry in Pokémon FireRed and LeafGreen
 Sea Satan – submarine in Metal Slug 4
 MS Spencer Rain – cruise liner in Resident Evil: Dead Aim
 USS Statesman – flagship of the US Agency fleet of submarines in Just Cause 4
 Tanager – Iowa-class battleship featured in Ace Combat 04: Shattered Skies
 USS Titan – Nimitz-class aircraft carrier from Battlefield 4
 U-4901 and U-4902 – Kriegsmarine sister ships from the Medal of Honor games
 Unnamed ship shaped like a rubber duck – used in LittleBigPlanet 2 to travel from Avalonia to Eve's Asylum for the Mentally Alternative
 USS Valkyrie – Wasp-class amphibious assault ship from Battlefield 4
 SS Venture – cargo ship in Lego Jurassic World
 SS Zelbess (alternately the SS Invincible) – Chrono Cross

Folklore, etc.
 Courser or the Tuscarora – Alfred Bulltop Stormalong's clipper ship
 Flying Dutchman
   – popular urban legend of the British Royal Navy
 Prydwen – ship of King Arthur in the poem Preiddeu Annwfn

See also
 Flying submarine
 Submarine films

References

Ships
Fictional ships